Oak Grove School District could refer to:

 Oak Grove School District (San Jose, California)
 Oak Grove Union School District (Sonoma County, California)
 Oak Grove School District 68 (Bartonville, Illinois), with two primary schools in Peoria County
 Oak Grove School District 68 (Lake County, Illinois), with one primary school in Green Oaks
 Oak Grove R-VI School District (Oak Grove, Missouri), in Jackson County
 Oak Grove School District No. 10 (Ray County, Missouri), which consolidated in 1950 with what became Hardin-Central School District
 Oak Grove Public School (Cushing, Oklahoma), a primary single-school district in Payne County
 Oak Grove School District (Arkansas), former school district in Arkansas

See also
 Oak Grove School (disambiguation)